, also known as "reverse pocky", is a chocolate and bread-based snack made by Lotte. Normally it consists of a hollowed bread stick with a filling of chocolate. Flavors include chocolate, "black" (chocolate flavored breadstick with a vanilla filling), "blue" (regular breadstick with a vanilla filling), green tea, strawberry, coffee mousse and many other seasonal flavors.

Lotte (conglomerate) products
Japanese snack food